Marsilio da Carrara (1294 – March 1338) was Lord of Padua after his uncle Jacopo I. He was a member of the Carraresi family.

He successfully faced a plot against him in the city. However, after treason of his nephew Nicolò da Carrara who had sided with the Scaliger of Verona, Marsilio was forced to relinquish Padua to Cangrande della Scala in 1328. He retained the title of vicar for the city, and managed to marry Jacopo's daughter Taddea to Mastino II della Scala.  In the war against the Papal States, he warred alongside the latter at Brescia in 1330/1331, conquering the city by treason. In the following years he acted as vicar of Brescia. In 1332 Marsilio had his wife Bartolomea Scrovegni poisoned, suspecting she was unfaithful.

After Cangrande's death, he was able to reconquer Padua in 1337 thanks to an alliance with Florence and Venice, which was increasingly worried by the Scaliger's rise of power.

He died in 1338, being succeeded by his cousin Ubertinello.

References
History and Chronology of Carraresi family  

1294 births
1338 deaths
Marsilio
Lords of Padua
14th-century condottieri
14th-century Italian nobility